Jalan Kampung Kuantan or Jalan Kelab (Selangor state route B77) is a major road in Selangor, Malaysia.

List of junctions

Roads in Selangor